The 1926 Chico State Wildcats football team represented Chico State Teachers College—now known as California State University, Chico—as a member of the California Coast Conference (CCC) during the 1926 college football season. Led by fourth-year head coach Art Acker, Chico State compiled an overall record of 5–2–1 with a mark of 5–0–1 in conference play, winning the CCC title for the third consecutive season. The team outscored its opponents 87 to 32  for the season. The Wildcats played home games at College Field in Chico, California.

Schedule

References

Chico State
Chico State Wildcats football seasons
California Coast Conference football champion seasons
Chico State Wildcats football